was a Japanese idol group known for singing anime songs, many of which have charted on Oricon. 

The group disbanded on March 31, 2021.

Members
Source:

Final lineup 

  (Original Member)
  (Joined March 5, 2018)
  (Joined March 5, 2018)
  (Joined March 5, 2018)
  (Joined March 5, 2018)
  (Joined March 5, 2018)
  (Joined March 5, 2018)

Former members 

  (Original Member; Left February 28, 2013)
  (Original Member; Left July 31, 2015)
  (Original Member; Left July 31, 2015)
  (Joined August 7, 2015; Left December 31, 2015)
  (Original Member; Left March 31, 2017)
  (Original Member; Left March 31, 2017)
  (Joined August 7, 2015; Graduated June 30, 2018)
  (Joined August 7, 2015; Graduated March 1, 2019)
  (Original Member; Graduated August 2, 2020)

Timeline

Discography

Singles

Albums

References

External links
Official site (in Japanese)

Japanese idol groups
2012 establishments in Japan
2021 disestablishments in Japan
Musical groups established in 2012
Musical groups disestablished in 2021
Anime singers